Our Troubled Youth is the Huggy Bear side of a split album they released with Bikini Kill (whose side was entitled Yeah Yeah Yeah Yeah). It was released on International Women's Day 1993 on Catcall Records in the United Kingdom, and on the Kill Rock Stars label in the United States.

Influence
Gordon Moakes of Bloc Party has cited the album's song "Blow Dry" as being influential to him when he heard it in the early 1990s. In 2008, he wrote that the song "...was so simple, so ugly, so daring. What those two minutes of feedback and scruffy drums warned of was a new language of rock'n'roll that was dangerous, alluring and turned everything that had come before on its head." In 2015, Lisa Wright of NME wrote of the album:

Track listing

References

External links
Our Troubled Youth at AllMusic

1993 albums
Kill Rock Stars albums
Split albums
Huggy Bear (band) albums